Limonlu (ancient: Antiochia Lamotidos; Byzantine: Lamousia; Arabic: Lāmis; Armenian: Lamos) is a small town in Mersin Province, Turkey (Popularly called Lamas).

Geography 

Limonlu is a coastal town at  It is by the river Limonlu. It is a part of Erdemli district of Mersin Province. The settled (winter) population was 3475 as of 2012.

History 
In antiquity the Limonlu River was the boundary between Cilicia Pedias and Cilicia Trachea, making Limonlu an important border town.  In the 10th century A.D. it was a Greek frontier post where prisoners of war were exchanged with the Arabs who controlled Cilicia Pedias.  The Byzantine Emperor Manuel I Komnenos captured the town from the Armenians in 1158, but lost it shortly thereafter to the Armenian Kingdom of Cilicia.  In the 1160s Vasak, the brother of the Armenian Baron of Papeŕōn (Çandır Castle), was listed in the Chronicle of Smbat as the lord of Lamas Castle. The Armenians maintained possession of this strategic site until the 14th-century invasion of the Karamanids.  The Ottomans captured the town and its fortress in the late 15th century.

The ruins of the castle are 1 kilometer (0.62 mi) north of the town and consist of a very symmetrical oval wall and at least five towers.  At the west end a large fortified wall with a square bastion is placed inside the circuit wall.  Most of the fort’s masonry consists of spolia taken from the nearby late antique city and necropolis.  Because of its peculiar plan, masonry, and techniques of construction, it is highly likely that this is a Byzantine castle.  An extensive photographic survey and plan of Limonlu fortress was made between 1973 and 1979.

Economy 

Like most Mediterranean coastal towns, Limonlu produces fresh vegetables and fruits. The town has specialized in citrus production and in fact the name of the town means with lemon. But lately, tourism has almost replaced agriculture as being the most important economic activity. In  Limonlu coastal band, there are many summer houses owned by city dwellers. The coastal band is also used for tent camps. Most of the town houses on the other hand, are rented as summer boarding houses.

University 

Middle East Technical University in Ankara has a campus just east of Limonlu (called Mersin–Erdemli campus) used by the Institute/Graduate School of Marine Sciences since 1975.

Notable native 
Nevit Kodallı, composer

References 

Populated places in Mersin Province
Populated coastal places in Turkey
Seaside resorts in Turkey
Towns in Turkey
Tourist attractions in Mersin Province
Populated places in Erdemli District